Niels Knudsen (15 October 1904 – 12 August 1987) was a Danish architect. His work was part of the architecture event in the art competition at the 1928 Summer Olympics.

References

1904 births
1987 deaths
20th-century Danish architects
Olympic competitors in art competitions
People from Vallensbæk Municipality